Saidabad (also Romanized as Sa‘īdābād) is a village in Saidabad Rural District, in the Central District of Savojbolagh County, Alborz Province, Iran. At the 2006 census, its population was 2,175, in 537 families.

References 

Populated places in Savojbolagh County